is a JR West railway station in the city of Fukui, Fukui, Japan.

Lines

Station layout
The station consists of one ground-level side platform serving single bi-directional track. There is no station building, but only a shelter on the platform. The station is unattended.

Adjacent stations

History
Hakariishi Station opened on December 15, 1960.  With the privatization of Japanese National Railways (JNR) on 1 April 1987, the station came under the control of JR West.

Surrounding area

 Joren-ji

See also
 List of railway stations in Japan

External links

  

Railway stations in Fukui Prefecture
Stations of West Japan Railway Company
Railway stations in Japan opened in 1960
Etsumi-Hoku Line
Fukui (city)